Conaperta is a genus of worms belonging to the family Convolutidae.

Species:

Conaperta antonii 
Conaperta cirrata 
Conaperta flavibacillum 
Conaperta lineata

References

Acoelomorphs